Awudu Issaka (born 26 June 1979) is a Ghanaian former professional footballer who played as a midfielder.

Club career
Issaka was born in Sunyani. He started playing football at the youth teams of Asante Kotoko, before he moved to Prampram Mighty Royals FC in Ghana's second division, where he already played for the first team at the age of fifteen. In 1995, soon after the FIFA World Youth Championship, Issaka signed a contract at the Belgian club R.S.C. Anderlecht, where he mainly played for their youth team. Issaka caught the eye of the French club AJ Auxerre, in 1996 at a youth tournament. Soon after that he agreed to play for Auxerre, where he played until 1998. In the 1998–99 season Issaka moved to German Bundesliga club TSV 1860 Munich, where he played until the 2003–04 season. Then he played for his former club Prampram Mighty Royals FC for the rest of the 2004–05 season. Issaka later moved to Liberty Professionals, and played the 2005–06 season in the Ghana Telecom Premier League in Ghana. In July 2006 Issaka, joined the newly promoted Ghana Telecom Premier League club Tema Youth.

International career
He played for the Ghana under-17 team in the FIFA World Youth Championship in 1995 in Ecuador. Issaka also took part in the FIFA World Youth Championship 1997 in Malaysia, where Ghana finished on fourth position.

Honours
 1997 FIFA World Youth Championship – 4th place
 1995 FIFA U-17 World Championship World Champion

References

1979 births
Living people
Ghanaian Muslims
Ghanaian footballers
Expatriate footballers in Belgium
Ghana international footballers
AJ Auxerre players
Expatriate footballers in France
TSV 1860 Munich II players
TSV 1860 Munich players
R.S.C. Anderlecht players
Bundesliga players
Expatriate footballers in Germany
Liberty Professionals F.C. players
Tema Youth players
Ghana under-20 international footballers
Association football midfielders